Buckhorn Mountain is a peak in the Olympic Mountains in the U.S. state of Washington. It is in Olympic National Forest on the Olympic Peninsula.

Description 

See also
List of mountains of the United States
 Iron Mountain

References

External links
 Olympic National Forest
 
 https://upload.wikimedia.org/wikipedia/commons/9/92/BuckhornSummitPanorama.jpg

Mountains of Washington (state)
Olympic Mountains
Mountains of Jefferson County, Washington